The 1985 Embassy World Darts Championship was the 8th World Professional Championships. The tournament was held between 5 and 12 January. It was the seventh and final time that the tournament was held at the Jollees Cabaret Club in Stoke-on-Trent, as the tournament organisers, the British Darts Organisation, decided to move the event to the Lakeside Country Club in Frimley Green, Surrey, from 1986. The Jollees Cabaret Club closed in 1992, due to losing money, not reopening until 2016.

Eric Bristow went into the tournament as defending champion and was almost beaten in the first round by Ken Summers. Summers had won the first set and was two legs to nil in front and left on 68 to pull off a major surprise. After hitting single 20 and single 16, he threw a potential match-winning dart at double sixteen just inside the wire of the single. Bristow then came back to win the match. Bristow went on to win his fourth World Title, extending his own record for victories. John Lowe suffered defeat in the final for the fourth time, failing to add to his only previous title – won in 1979.

Keith Deller, champion two years previously, set a new record for becoming the first player to average over 100 with his three darts during a match at the World Championship. His average of 100.30 was not enough to win his quarter-final against John Lowe, who averaged 97.83. Bristow almost matched this record in his semi-final victory over Dave Whitcombe. Bristow fell just short of a hundred, with an average of 99.66. In the final against Lowe, Bristow exactly equalled the then record for the highest average in a World Championship final, of 97.50, from the previous year's final of Bristow vs. Whitcombe.

Prize money
Total Prize fund was £43,000 (plus a £51,000 bonus for a nine-dart finish – not won)
 Champion £10,000
 Runner-up £5,000
 Semi-finalists £2,500
 Quarter-finalists £1,500
 2nd round losers £1,000
 1st round losers £500
 Highest checkout £1,000

Seeds
  Eric Bristow
  John Lowe
  Mike Gregory
  Jocky Wilson
  Dave Whitcombe
  Cliff Lazarenko
  Dave Lee
  Steve Brennan

The Results

References

External links
 Official BDO website

BDO World Darts Championships
BDO World Darts 1985
Bdo World Darts Championship, 1985
Bdo World Darts Championship